Muhammad Sajjad Awan is a Pakistani politician who has been a member of the National Assembly of Pakistan, since August 2018.

Political career
He was elected to the National Assembly of Pakistan as a candidate of Pakistan Muslim League (N) from Constituency NA-14 (Mansehra-cum-Torghar) in 2018 Pakistani general election. He received 74,889 votes and defeated Zar Gul Khan.

References

Living people
Pakistani MNAs 2018–2023
Year of birth missing (living people)